The 2022 European Pairs Speedway Championship was the 19th edition of the European Pairs Speedway Championship. the final was held in Slangerup, Denmark on 27 August. 

The second semi final was held in Mâcon in France on 23 July, where defending champions France were eliminated, along with Italy and the Netherlands. The first semi final was held in Nagyhalasz in Hungary 8 July and saw Slovenia, Ukraine, Hungary and Finland eliminated.
 
The title was won by Denmark for the first time.

Final

See also 
 2022 Speedway European Championship

References 

2022
European Championship Pairs
Speedway European Championship
European Pairs Speedway
European Pairs Speedway Championship